Norm Thompson may refer to:

Norm Thompson (American football) (b. 1945), American football player in the 1970s
Norm Thompson Outfitters, American catalog retailer founded by Norm A. Thompson
Norm Thompson (Australian footballer) (born 1933)